This is a list of ski resorts in the German Central Uplands; it does not cover ski resorts in the German Alps.

The table is fully sortable - just click on the square icon by the column header to sort on that column.

Notes:
 1 State = Federal state (abbreviations based on ISO 3166-2:DE) 
 2 Height of the ski resort in metres above sea level 
 3 Lifts = Number of lifts (gondolas / chair lifts / drag lifts)
 4 Pistes = Ski piste length in kilometres

See also 
 List of ski resorts in the German Alps

External links 
 Wintersport in Deutschland auf Wikivoyage - Information on ski resorts in the German Central Uplands. 

!
Skiing in Germany
German Central Uplands